The Doiceşti Power Station is a large thermal power plant located in Doicești, having 7 generation groups, 6 of 20 MW each and one of 200 MW resulting a total electricity generation capacity of 320 MW. The power plant also has another 200 MW unit but it is decommissioned.

The chimney used by the 200 MW units is 208 metres tall.

References

External links
Description 

Natural gas-fired power stations in Romania